Ena Sandra Causevic (born 21 August 1989) is a Danish model from Sønderborg, Denmark. She was appointed to represent Denmark in Las Vegas at the Miss Universe 2010 pageant. Besides her work as a model she has studied communications and has participated in charities for families with cancer affected children.

References

1989 births
Living people
Danish female models
People from Sønderborg Municipality
People from Copenhagen
Miss Universe 2010 contestants
Danish beauty pageant winners
Danish people of Serbian descent
Danish people of Bosnia and Herzegovina descent